The Allegheny Reservoir (also known as Kinzua Lake and unofficially as Lake Perfidy) is a reservoir along the Allegheny River in Pennsylvania and New York, USA. It was created in 1965 by the construction of the Kinzua Dam along the river. Lake Perfidy comes from Peter La Farge's ballad "As Long as the Grass Shall Grow," recorded by Johnny Cash on his album Bitter Tears: Ballads of the American Indian, which alleged that the reservoir's existence violates the 1794 agreement between Seneca chief Cornplanter and George Washington.

History
The Allegheny Reservoir is a man-made lake created along the Allegheny River with the construction of the Kinzua Dam in 1965. The dam was authorized by the United States Congress as a flood control measure in the Flood Control Acts of 1936 and 1938, and was built by the U. S. Army Corps of Engineers beginning in 1960. Other benefits from the dam include drought control, hydroelectric power production, and recreation. The lake and the dam are operated by the U.S. Army Corps of Engineers. The construction of the lake and dam cost $108 million and (along with the concurrent construction of the Southern Tier Expressway) destroyed the hamlets of Kinzua, Sugar Run, Cornplanter (Indian Reservation) and Corydon in Pennsylvania, and the hamlets of Onoville, Quaker Bridge, Cold Spring and Red House in New York, led to the dissolution of the Pennsylvania townships of Kinzua and West Corydon, and the New York town of Elko, and flooded some of the lands of the Seneca Nation. The residents in these areas were forced to move. The area is unique because very little private development exists along the reservoir.

Geography
The Allegheny Reservoir is surrounded by the Allegheny National Forest in Pennsylvania and Allegany State Park and the Seneca Nation's Allegany Reservation in New York. The undammed end of the reservoir reaches near the city of Salamanca. Much of Allegheny National Recreation Area surrounds the reservoir.

References

Reservoirs in Pennsylvania
Reservoirs in New York (state)
Protected areas of Warren County, Pennsylvania
Protected areas of McKean County, Pennsylvania
Allegheny River
Protected areas of Cattaraugus County, New York
Allegheny National Forest
Bodies of water of McKean County, Pennsylvania
Bodies of water of Warren County, Pennsylvania
Reservoirs in Cattaraugus County, New York